The following is a list of LGBT podcasts.

List

References

External links 
 LGBT podcasts on Player.fm

Podcasts
LGBT
LGBT-related podcasts